Ang Zhiwei is a Singaporean footballer who plays in the S.League for Warriors FC. He started his career as an attacking midfielder but now plays as a defender.

Club career

And started focusing on football after rejection from his school basketball team due to his height.

Ang started off as a player in the Prime League until he came to prominence in the 2009 S.League season when he formed part of the Geylang United squad which overcame reigning Singapore Cup champions, Bangkok Glass, to capture the Singapore Cup. His performance also led to him being selected for the Singapore Under-21 National Team.

As he was conscripted for National Service in 2010, his professional footballing career came to a standstill. Ang turned out for NFL Division One side, Singapore Armed Forces Sports Association (SAFSA) during his two years as a national serviceman and was the captain of the SAFSA side.

Geylang United
Upon the completion of his national service, Ang returned to Geylang United for the 2012 S.League season, where he played his first full season with the Eagles.

Woodlands Wellington
On 1 January 2013, it was announced that he had joined Woodlands Wellington along with Shahril Alias after spending one season at Bedok Stadium, joining up with former Geylang United captain and goalkeeper, Yazid Yasin.

He made his debut for Woodlands Wellington on 21 February 2013 in a 2–2 draw against Warriors F.C.

Tampines Rovers
On 21 December 2013, Tampines Rovers announced the signing of Ang for the 2014 season.

Home United
Following a disappointing 2014 season, Home United signed Ang along with three other of his Tampines Rovers teammates.

International career

Ang was selected for the Singapore Under-21 National Team in 2008.

While taking part in the annual Vietnam Youth Newspaper Cup competition in 2009, Ang scored his first international goal against Thailand Under-21 in a 3–1 victory on 11 October 2009.

Club Career Statistics

All numbers encased in brackets signify substitute appearances.

References

External links
 

Singaporean footballers
Living people
1989 births
Warriors FC players
Woodlands Wellington FC players
Tampines Rovers FC players
Geylang International FC players
Singaporean sportspeople of Chinese descent
Singapore Premier League players
Association football midfielders